George William Frederick Villiers, 4th Earl of Clarendon,  (12 January 180027 June 1870) was an English diplomat and statesman from the Villiers family.

He served as Secretary of State for Foreign Affairs three times as part of a distinguished diplomatic career. He was the leading British representative at the Congress of Paris which ended the Crimean War.

Background and education
Villiers was born in London, the son of George Villiers and Theresa Parker. He went up to Cambridge at the early age of sixteen and entered St John's College on 29 June 1816. In 1820, as the eldest son of an earl's brother with royal descent, he was able to take his MA degree under the statutes of the university then in force.

Career
In the same year, he was appointed attaché to the British embassy at Saint Petersburg. There he remained three years, and gained practical knowledge of diplomacy which would be of use to him later in his life. The Encyclopaedia Britannica stated that he had "received from nature a singularly handsome person, a polished and engaging address, a ready command of languages, and a remarkable power of composition". Upon his return to England in 1823, he was appointed to a commissionership of customs, an office which he retained for about ten years. In 1831, he was despatched to France in a fruitless attempt to negotiate a commercial treaty.

Minister in Spain 
On 16 August 1833, he was appointed minister at the court of Spain. Ferdinand VII died within a month of his arrival at Madrid, and the infant Queen Isabella, then two years old, was placed on the throne based on the old Spanish custom of female inheritance, but her succession was challenged by Don Carlos, the late King's brother, by virtue of the Salic law of the House of Bourbon which Ferdinand had renounced before the birth of his daughter. Isabella II and her mother the Queen Regent Christina, became the representatives of constitutional monarchy, Don Carlos of Catholic absolutism. The conflict which had divided the despotic and the constitutional powers of Europe since the French Revolution of 1830 broke out into civil war in Spain, and by the Quadruple Treaty, signed on 22 April 1834, France and England pledged themselves to the defence of the constitutional thrones of Spain and Portugal. For six years, on behalf of the British government, Villiers continued to aid the Liberal government of Spain. He was unjustly accused of having supported the revolution of La Granja, which drove Christina, the Queen Mother, out of the kingdom, and raised Espartero to the regency. He undoubtedly supported the chiefs of the Liberal party, such as Espartero, against the intrigues of the French court; but the object of the British government was to establish Isabella as Queen on a truly national and liberal basis and to protect her against the foreign influence which eventually undermined her regime.

Slavery had been declared illegal in Spanish colonies from 1820, but still had not been eradicated. Villiers worked with the help of the Times correspondent David Turnbull to get slavery removed from Spanish colonies. In 1835 the Spanish reaffirmed their commitment to end slavery.

Succession to the Earldom, Offices of State in Britain 
Villiers received the Grand Cross of the Bath in 1838 in acknowledgment of his services in Spain, and succeeded, on the death of his uncle, to the title of Earl of Clarendon; in the following year, having left Madrid, he married a young widow, Lady Katharine Foster-Barham (née Grimston), eldest daughter of James Grimston, 1st Earl of Verulam.

In January 1840 he entered Lord Melbourne's Whig administration as Lord Privy Seal, and from the death of Lord Holland that autumn he also held the office of Chancellor of the Duchy of Lancaster until the end of the ministry in 1841. Clarendon and Holland believed that friendly Anglo-French relations were important to promote peace and liberalism in Europe. He reluctantly supported Foreign Secretary Lord Palmerston's expulsion of the pro-French Mohammed Ali of Egypt from Syria but did not resign as it might break up a cabinet he had so recently joined.

During Sir Robert Peel's Conservative administration (1841–1846) Lord Clarendon took a strong interest in the triumph of free trade and in the repeal of the Corn Laws, a policy for which his younger brother Charles Pelham Villiers had been one of the earliest champions. Clarendon accepted the office of President of the Board of Trade in Lord John Russell's first administration in 1846.

Lord Lieutenant of Ireland 
Clarendon was twice offered the Governor-Generalship of India, and once the Governor-Generalship of Canada, but he declined as it would have meant leaving British and European politics for some years.

In 1847, Clarendon was persuaded to accept the Lord Lieutenancy of Ireland, which the Cabinet wanted to abolish and transform into an Irish secretaryship of state. He arrived during the second year of the Great Famine. Agrarian crimes had trebled and the Catholic clergy were openly hostile. Extraordinary measures were required to retain the control by the Westminster government. The French Revolution of 1848 inspired further unrest, culminating in an abortive rebellion. Lord Clarendon remained Viceroy of Ireland till 1852. His services were expressly acknowledged in the Queen's Speech to both Houses of Parliament in September 1848 - this being the first time that any civil servant obtained that honour; and he was made a Knight of the Garter (retaining also the Grand Cross of the Bath by special order) on 23 March 1849.

Foreign Secretary

In January 1853, Clarendon succeeded Lord John Russell as Foreign Secretary in Lord Aberdeen's coalition ministry of Whigs and Peelites, which had been formed the previous December. The country was already "drifting" into the Crimean War, an expression of Clarendon's which became notorious. Clarendon was not responsible for starting the war, but he supported it and maintained close relations with the French Emperor Napoleon III, and the Empress Eugenie, whom he had known in Spain from her childhood. The Tsar Nicholas I had not believed that France and Britain could cooperate successfully against Russia.

When the Crimean War ended in 1856 Lord Clarendon was first British plenipotentiary at the Congress of Paris convened to negotiate a peace treaty, the first time since Lord Castlereagh's attendance at the Congress of Vienna that a British Foreign Secretary had personally attended such a conference. Clarendon's first priority was to ensure that Piedmont-Sardinia was admitted to the conference as an Allied power, but that Prussia, which had remained neutral, should be excluded. Clarendon ensured that the Allies insisted on neutralising the Black Sea and that the Russian attempt to retain South Bessarabia was defeated. The congress was eager to turn to other subjects, and perhaps its most important achievement was the celebrated Declaration of the Maritime Powers, which abolished privateering, defined the right of blockade, and limited the right of capture to enemy property in enemy ships. Clarendon has been accused of abandoning Britain's belligerent rights, which were based on the old maritime laws of Europe. But he acted with the agreement of the British Cabinet, which felt that it was not to Britain's benefit keep to customs which exposed Britain's vast merchant fleet to attack, even by the cruisers of a secondary maritime power, and which, if vigorously enforced against neutrals, would embroil Britain with every maritime state in the world.

When Lord Palmerston formed a Liberal government in 1859, Lord John Russell only agreed to serve if given the Foreign Office, leaving no suitably senior job for Clarendon. Clarendon re-entered the cabinet in May 1864 as Chancellor of the Duchy of Lancaster. He served as Foreign Secretary a second time in Russell's second government (1865-66), and for a third time in the early years of Gladstone's government formed in 1868. He died surrounded by the boxes and papers of his office on 27 June 1870.

Family

On 4 June 1839, Villiers married the widowed Lady Katherine Foster-Barham (a daughter of James Grimston, 1st Earl of Verulam) and they had eight children:

Lady Constance Villiers (1840–1922), married Frederick Stanley, 16th Earl of Derby.
Lady Alice Villiers (1841–1897), married Edward Bootle-Wilbraham, 1st Earl of Lathom.
Lady Emily Theresa (1843–1927), married Odo Russell, 1st Baron Ampthill.
Edward Hyde, Lord Hyde (1845–1846).
Edward Villiers, 5th Earl of Clarendon (1846–1914).
Hon. George Patrick Hyde (1847–1892), married Louisa Maria Maquay, daughter of George Disney Maquay, on 9 October 1884.
Lady Florence Margaret (1850–1851).
Hon. Francis Hyde Villiers (1852–1925), married Virginia Katharine Smith, daughter of Eric Carrington Smith and Mary Maberly, on 28 June 1876.

Notes

Further reading

 David Steele. "Villiers, George William Frederick, fourth earl of Clarendon" Dictionary of National Biography (2009) 
 Cecil, Algernon. British Foreign Secretaries 1807-1916 (1927) pp 220–255. online
 Sir Herbert Eustace Maxwell: The Life and letters of George William Frederick 4. Earl of Clarendon. London: Arnold, 1913. online
 George Villiers Clarendon: First report on the commercial relations between France and Great Britain, addressed to ... the lords of the committee of privy council for trade and plantations: with a supplementary report, by John Bowring. London, 1834

External links

 

1800 births
1870 deaths
4
Alumni of St John's College, Cambridge
Knights of the Garter
Knights of St Patrick
Knights Grand Cross of the Order of the Bath
Liberal Party (UK) hereditary peers
Diplomatic peers
British Secretaries of State for Foreign Affairs
Lords Lieutenant of Ireland
Lords Privy Seal
Members of the Privy Council of the United Kingdom
Chancellors of the Duchy of Lancaster
George Villiers, 4th Earl of Clarendon
Politicians from London
Presidents of the Board of Trade
Ambassadors of the United Kingdom of Great Britain and Ireland to Spain